Noe Meza (born February 13, 1998) is an American soccer player who plays as a forward for Union Omaha in USL League One.

Career

Youth, College & Amateur
Meza attended Sunnyside High School, where he helped his team to became District, Regional and League Champions in 2014. He was Big Nine Conference First Team in 2013, 2014 and 2015, top scorer for the team in 2014 and 2015, and named Team MVP in 2015. Meza also played club soccer with Three Rivers Soccer Club, Yakima United, who competed in the Evergreen Premier League, and Crossfire Academy.

In 2016, Meza attended Seattle University to play college soccer. He redshirted his freshman season, but went on to make 62 appearances for the Redhawks, scoring 21 goals and tallying six assists. Meza was named First Team All-WAC in his senior year.

While at college, Meza played in the USL League Two. In 2019, he made five appearances, scoring four goals for Seattle Sounders FC U-23. In 2021, he made 11 appearances for Charlotte Eagles, scoring a single goal.

Professional
On February 1, 2022, Meza signed his first professional contract with USL League One club Union Omaha. He made his professional league debut for Omaha on April 9, 2022, starting in a 2–2 draw with Forward Madison FC.

References

External links
 Profile at Seattle University Athletics

1998 births
Living people
American soccer players
Association football forwards
Charlotte Eagles players
People from Sunnyside, Washington
Seattle Redhawks men's soccer players
Seattle Sounders FC U-23 players
Soccer players from Washington (state)
Union Omaha players
USL League One players
USL League Two players